Sepak takraw was contested at the 2009 Asian Indoor Games in Hanoi, Vietnam from October 31 to November 2. The competition took place at the Ha Dong Competition Hall.

Medalists

Medal table

Results

Men

Round 1
31 October

Round 2
1 November

Knockout round
2 November

Women

Round 1
31 October

Round 2
1 November

Knockout round
2 November

References
 Official site

2009 Asian Indoor Games events
2009